The Matthews House is a historic house at 406 Goshen Street in North Little Rock, Arkansas.  Built in 1928, it is an unusually modern interpretation of Georgian Revival architecture, designed by Frank Carmean and built by Justin Matthews as a showcase home for his Park Hill development.  It has a stuccoed exterior, and its shape is that of squares intersecting at a circular stairwell.  Its interior exhibits elements of Art Deco styling.  The house was widely advertised by Matthews after its completion, and more than 20,000 people are estimated to have toured it.

The house was listed on the National Register of Historic Places in 1983.

See also
National Register of Historic Places listings in Pulaski County, Arkansas

References

Houses on the National Register of Historic Places in Arkansas
Houses completed in 1928
Houses in North Little Rock, Arkansas
National Register of Historic Places in Pulaski County, Arkansas